Hayden Peak is a peak on the western edge of the High Uintas Wilderness in the Uinta-Wasatch-Cache National Forest in the western Uinta Mountain Range Summit County, Utah, United States.

Description
The mountain is home to mountain goats, pika and many species of wildflowers. The peak is named for Ferdinand Hayden, an American geologist noted for his pioneering surveying expeditions of the Rocky Mountains in the late 19th century.

See also

 List of mountains in Utah

References

External links

 

Mountains of Utah
Features of the Uinta Mountains
Mountains of Summit County, Utah